Mount Everest in 2018 is about events in the year about the highest Earth mountain, Mount Everest, a popular mountaineering tourism and science destination in the 2010s. In 2018, 807 climbers summited Mount Everest, which is a popular mountaineering goal. This year is noted for an especially long weather window of 11 days straight of calm, which reduced crowding at the high base camps. With over 800 reaching the top, it was the highest amount ever to reach the top in recorded history, besting the previous year by over 150 summitings.

Overview

807 climbers summited Mount Everest in 2018, including 563 on the Nepal side and 240 from the Chinese Tibet side. This broke the previous record for total summits in year from which was 667 in 2013, and one factor that aided in this was an especially long and clear weather window of 11 days during the critical spring climbing season.

Various records were broken including an extraordinary case of a 70-year-old double-amputee, who undertook his climb after winning a court case in the Nepali Supreme Court. There was no major disasters, but seven climbers died in various situations including several sherpas as well as international climbers. Although record numbers of climbers reached the summit, old-time summiters that made expeditions in the 1980s lamented the crowding, feces, and cost.

Famous Himalayan record keeper Elizabeth Hawley died in late January 2018. One of the issues is if the height is from the rock summit or includes the ice and snow, which can add a significant amount of height. It is known the height of Everest may be changes due to the movement of on tectonic plates, which may raise or lower it depending on the type of tectonic event. At present the plate movements are adding to the height and moving the summit to the northeast; see Mount Everest.

Another goal in 2018 of many organizations is to remove trash from the mountain and nature areas. Various incentives for Sherpassuch as $2 per kilo of trash removed, and up to $500 for returning a discarded oxygen bottlehave resulted in cleaned-up trails.

This season brought additional confirmation that the Hillary Step has been altered, with climbers describing it as a slope. It used to be a 40-foot (12-meter) climbing face below the summit, with clear reports in previous years that there was a lot of snow, making it harder to determine what had happened. In particular, one large stone of about five meters in height is gone. The step was famous since it was first known to have been climbed by Hillary and Tenzing Norgay in 1953, and was named after Hillary.

Nepal honoured several mountain climbers, including those that summited Everest in the 1970s and went on to conduct humanitarian projects in the impoverished land-locked country. Climbers honoured by Nepal included Wolfgang Nairz, Oswald Ölz, Peter Habeler, Raimund Magreiter, Robert Schauer, Hanns Schell and Helmuth Hagner. Nepal also honored Reinhold Messner and Peter Habeler in April 2018, for their 1978 climb of Mount Everest.

Everest has claimed perhaps 300 lives in the last century of expeditions on the mountain, often with little regard to a climber's skillit has claimed the careless and sometimes the careful as well. The weather window is a time, in modern times carefully watched with modern weather observation and prediction technology, to find the time of calm to avoid treacherously high winds which are known to reach .

A gourmet pop-up restaurant at Everest Base camp was planned this year, making international news. A group of chefs planned a seven course meal featuring local ingredients, and one of the challenges of serving gourmet food at high altitude is that people's sense of taste is altered. The Chef noted he planned to use the style of cooking Sous-vide on the expedition.

On 13 May 2018, a group of Nepali climbers reached the summit of Mount Everest, the first of the season. This group paves the way for more climbers to reach from the Nepal side of the mountain, and 346 permits were granted for this year in the climbing season which runs in the spring from April to the end of May. As of April 2018, about 350 climbing permits for tourists had been issued so far on the Nepal side. Another 180 climbers were said to be making a summit bid from the northern side, in China (Tibet region). This is the time when there are a few days of calm and good weather high on the mountain.

Some of the fatalities this season were a Japanese climber who died on his 8th attempt and was known for returning to make a summit attempt in 2015 even after he lost nine of his fingers in an attempt to summit in 2012. Also, a climber from Macedonia is reported to have died on the mountain. By 19 May 2018, the Kathmandu Times reports that at least 277 climbers had summited Mount Everest. About 5 people are reported to have died or gone missing mountaineering at Mount Everest by late May 2018, including Nobukazu Kuriki, Gjeorgi Petkov, Rustem Amirov, and Lama Babu Sherpa.

Among those that summited this year was a team led by Adrian Ballinger, including Neal Beidleman who survived the 1996 Mount Everest disaster and returned to summit this season. Record-breaking woman summiter Lhakpa Sherpa summited Mount Everest again, making 2018 her 9th summit of Mount Everest, meanwhile Kami Rita Sherpa attained his 22nd summit in 2018, overtaking the previous maximum of 21 set by Apa Sherpa.

The famous British climber Kenton Cool increased his summit tally to 13 in 2018, the most for the United Kingdom. Olympic Gold Medal winner Victoria Pendleton, made a summit bid with Cool, but her summit bid had to be abandoned due to altitude sickness. One reason for this was that a weather window opened up earlier than expected, but her body was not taking in enough oxygen. Her partners Ben Fogle and Kenton Cool reached the summit on 16 May. This was televised and published as a book, as also was the ascent and summit of Ant Middleton with Ed Wardle, coincidentally taking place at the same time.

Some of the various national record-makers for the year include Alyssa Azar, who became the youngest Australian to summit the mountain in 2016 when she was just 19 and reached the summit again in 2018. The achievement also makers her the youngest Australian to summit Mount Everest, to summit it twice, and youngest from both south and north sides of the mountain. A group of woman journalists that climbed Everest as part of the Women Journalists Everest Expedition-2018 was awarded for their expedition by the Prime Minister of Nepal, in Kathmandu.

Comparison

In the media

Television
Extreme Everest (Parable, Channel 4, 2018) with Ant Middleton.
Our Everest Challenge (ITV)/The Challenge:Everest (CNN) (CNN Vision, 2018) with Ben Fogle and Victoria Pendleton.

Books
Up: My Life's Journey to the Top of Everest (Ben Fogle and Marina Fogle, William Collins, 2018) 
The Fear Bubble: Harness Fear and live without limits (Ant Middleton, HarperCollins, 2019)

References

2018 in Nepal
2018